Glenn Humphries (born 11 August 1964) is an English former footballer who played as a defender in the Football League for Doncaster Rovers, Lincoln City, Bristol City, Scunthorpe United and Hull City, and in the Hong Kong First Division League for Golden. He was part of the Doncaster team promoted from the Fourth Division in the 1983–84 season.

References

External links
 
 League stats at Neil Brown's site

1964 births
Living people
Footballers from Kingston upon Hull
English footballers
Association football defenders
Doncaster Rovers F.C. players
Lincoln City F.C. players
Bristol City F.C. players
Scunthorpe United F.C. players
Sun Hei SC players
Hull City A.F.C. players
Gainsborough Trinity F.C. players
English Football League players
Hong Kong First Division League players
Expatriate footballers in Hong Kong
English expatriate sportspeople in Hong Kong
English expatriate footballers